

St. Paul's Episcopal Church of Brooklyn at 423 Clinton Street at Carroll Street in the Carroll Gardens neighborhood of Brooklyn, New York City was built from 1867 to 1884 and was designed by Richard Upjohn & Son in the High Victorian Gothic style.  It was added to the National Register of Historic Places in 1989.

The parish is part of the Episcopal Church in the United States of America in the Episcopal Diocese of Long Island, part of the worldwide Anglican Communion, in the Anglo-Catholic tradition.

Parish history 
St. Paul's was founded on Christmas Day of 1849, in South Brooklyn, then the quickly developing southward expansion of old Brooklyn Heights. New homes and businesses were covering old countryside, farmland, and shoreline; industrialization was bringing a new way of life to the City of Brooklyn, waves of immigrants from the nations of the world were arriving and the American Civil War was looming.  This was also the era when the Anglican Communion of Churches was experiencing a renewed vision of their catholic faith and order often called the "Anglo-Catholic Revival" of the Oxford Movement. Saint Paul's was formed in heady days of philosophical, social, economic, and religious change.

See also

References
Notes

External links

Official website

Properties of religious function on the National Register of Historic Places in Brooklyn
Gothic Revival church buildings in New York City
Churches completed in 1866
19th-century Episcopal church buildings
Churches in Brooklyn
Anglo-Catholic church buildings in the United States
Episcopal church buildings in New York City
New York City Designated Landmarks in Brooklyn
Culture of Brooklyn
Richard Michell Upjohn church buildings
Richard Upjohn church buildings
Carroll Gardens, Brooklyn
1866 establishments in New York (state)